Leonard "Jack" Stohr (13 November 1889 – 25 July 1973) was a New Zealand rugby union player. A three-quarter, Stohr represented  at a provincial level, and was a member of the New Zealand national side, the All Blacks, in 1910 and 1913. He played 15 matches for the All Blacks including three internationals. Stohr served in the New Zealand Medical Corps during World War I, during which he was also involved with Services rugby in Britain. Following the war, he was a member of the New Zealand Army team that won the King's Cup in 1919 against other British Empire teams, and then toured South Africa. He returned to New Zealand in 1919, but moved to South Africa the following year, and lived there for the rest of his life.

References

1889 births
1973 deaths
Rugby union players from New Plymouth
People educated at New Plymouth Boys' High School
New Zealand rugby union players
New Zealand international rugby union players
Taranaki rugby union players
Rugby union centres
Rugby union wings
New Zealand Military Forces personnel of World War I
New Zealand emigrants to South Africa